Skjern Municipality is a former municipality (Danish, kommune) in Ringkøbing-Skjern Municipality in Region Midtjylland near the west coast of the Jutland peninsula in west Denmark.  The former Skjern municipality covered an area of 327 km2, and had a total population of 13,107 (2005).
The city has a population of 7,563 inhabitants.

The main town was Skjern.

 Bølling Parish
 Dejbjerg Parish
 Faster Parish
 Fjelstervang Parish
 Hanning Parish
 Skjern Parish
 Stavning Parish
 Sædding Parish
 Sønder Borris Parish

On 1 January 2007 Skjern Municipality ceased to exist due to Kommunalreformen ("The Municipality Reform" of 2007).  It was merged with existing Egvad, Holmsland,  Ringkøbing, and Videbæk municipalities to form the new Ringkøbing-Skjern Municipality.  This created a municipality with an area of 1,485 km2 and a total population of 57,818 (2005).

External links 
 The municipality's official cooperation and tourism information website

References  
 Municipal statistics: NetBorger Kommunefakta, delivered from KMD aka Kommunedata (Municipal Data)
 Municipal mergers and neighbors: Eniro new municipalities map
 City population : Danmarks Statistik 

Former municipalities of Denmark